Scrobipalpa dorsolutea is a moth in the family Gelechiidae. It was described by Peter Huemer and Ole Karsholt in 2010. It is found in the southern Ural Mountains.

References

Scrobipalpa
Moths described in 2010